Lee Clayton (born 1970) is an English sports journalist who is Global Publisher of Sport at DMGT, which comprises The Daily Mail, Mail on Sunday and Mail Online. He was formerly Head of talkSPORT radio in the UK and former Head of Sport at The Daily Mail, Mail on Sunday and Mail Online. He is an avid West Ham supporter and season ticket holder and co-authored Farewell to Upton Park: The Official Celebration of West Ham United's home 1904–2016.

Aged 16 he joined The Sun in the mail room, before being offered a role on the sports desk, despite never attaining any formal journalistic qualifications. He attended Brampton Manor Comprehensive School in East London and joined News International in 1986. In 1987, he appeared in The News, the in-house newspaper, as one of "News International’s Rising Stars".

He joined the Sunday Mirror in 1994 before becoming chief football writer on The Daily Star later that year. He became sports editor of the Sunday People in 1999 before joining The Daily Mail in 2004, where he spent 14 years as group head of sport and won numerous awards.

In his first 18 months as head of talkSPORT he was praised by the Sports Journalist Association as the station won the 'Sports Network of the Year' award for “making a number of innovative changes in this past year to diversify their audience and enhance their credibility”.

Clayton contributed to the Debrett's 500 list in 2014 and 2015 and was on the judging panel for the 2012 BBC Sports Personality of the Year. He also contributed to the novel Forgive Us Our Press Passes.

He has appeared on various television programmes including Sky’s Soccer Saturday, Hold the Back Page, Dream Team and BBC’s pilot episode of Match of the Day Two. In radio broadcasting he has presented numerous programmes for talkSPORT, including the Sunday Breakfast show with former Republic of Ireland striker Tony Cascarino and ex-Chelsea captain Andy Townsend.

In 2011 he was previewed as one of the 20 most influential people Sky Sports have worked with for their 20th Anniversary.

Awards 
 2013 Sports Newspaper of the Year
 2014 Sports Newspaper of the Year
 2014 Sports Website of the Year  
 2015 Sports Newspaper of the Year
 2016 Sports Newspaper of the Year
 2018 Sports Network of the Year

Bibliography 
Farewell to Upton Park: The Official Celebration of West Ham United's home 1904–2016 (2016) with Andy Hooper

References

External links 
 Lee Clayton Twitter page

1970 births
Living people
British sports journalists